Spion Kop (or Kop for short) is a colloquial name or term for a number of single tier terraces and stands at sports stadiums, particularly in the United Kingdom, the most famous example of which is the Kop Stand at Liverpool F.C.'s home ground, Anfield.

Their steep nature resembles the Spion Kop hill near Ladysmith, South Africa, that was the scene of the Battle of Spion Kop in January 1900 during the Second Boer War.

History 

The first recorded reference to a sports terrace as "Kop" related to Woolwich Arsenal's Manor Ground in 1904.
A local newsman likened the silhouette of fans standing on a newly raised bank of earth to soldiers standing atop the hill at the Battle of Spion Kop. Two years later in 1906, Liverpool Echo sports editor Ernest Edwards noted of a new open-air embankment at Anfield: "This huge wall of earth has been termed 'Spion Kop', and no doubt this apt name will always be used in future in referring to this spot." 

The use of the name for the stand was given recognition at Anfield in 1928 when it was extended to a 27,000 capacity and a cantilever roof was added which amplified the roar of the crowd to create an intense atmosphere. Traditionally, Liverpool's most vocal supporters congregate in this stand and are referred to as kopites. Such is the reputation of the stand that it was nonsensically 
claimed that the crowd in the Kop could suck the ball into the goal and it has become one of the most famous football stands in the world.

Liverpool's Spion Kop (capacity 27,000, although crowds of 30,000+ have been recorded) was redesigned in 1994 (completed) to comply with requirements of the Taylor Report, which made all-seater stadiums obligatory in the highest two divisions of English football. A new Spion Kop was built in its place with 12,390 seats, making it the largest single-tier stand in the country at the time. This new Kop still stands and currently houses the club's museum.
 
Following the opening of the new Tottenham Hotspur Stadium, Anfield's Kop ceased to be the largest single-tier stand in the country. The South Stand of the new stadium has 17,500 seats and has an incline of 34 degrees, making it one of the steepest stands in the country.

Villa Park's old Holte End was historically the largest of all Kop ends, closely followed by the old South Bank at Molineux, both once regularly holding crowds in excess of 30,000.

Many other English football clubs and some rugby league clubs (such as Wigan's former home Central Park) applied the same name to stands in later years.

Composition 
There is much debate about what type of stand constitutes a Kop. The size and location of the stand in the stadium varies; most are located behind the goal and are occupied by its club's most vocal supporters. It is usually a single-tiered stand and was traditionally terraced. In England, safety regulations brought into effect after the 1989 Hillsborough disaster required many to be made all-seated. A Kop is not necessarily the largest stand in the stadium and does not have to have a particularly large capacity; for example, Chesterfield's former stadium, Saltergate, had a Kop with a capacity of only a few thousand.

Kops

References

Sources 

 Inglis, Simon. The Football Grounds of England and Wales (Collins Willow, 1982)
 Kelly, Stephen F. The Kop, (Virgin Books, 2005)
 Pearce, James. How Kop tuned in to glory days, Liverpool Echo. 23 August 2006.
 Chapple, Mike. Spion Kop's mixture of myth and magic Liverpool Daily Post, 25 August 2006.

External links 
 The incredible story behind the Kop Guided by local historian Raymond Heron, BBC Sport's Mark Lawrenson visits Spion Kop in South Africa.

Association football terminology
Liverpool F.C.